The Scott Mountains are a subrange of the Klamath Mountains located in Siskiyou County, in northwestern California.

Geography
The Scott Mountains are a sub-range within the Klamath Mountains System. The Klamath system are of the Pacific Coast Ranges series of mountain range systems that stretch along the West Coast of North America.

The Scott Mountains run from southern Siskiyou County southeast into northern Trinity County.

California State Route 3 passes through the range.

Recreation
The range is within sections of the Klamath National Forest and Shasta-Trinity National Forest.

Scott Mountain Campground, is at the Scott Mountain summit in the Shasta-Trinity National Forest section. It is located on the summit's west side at the junction of the Pacific Crest Trail and California State Route 3.

Ecology
Ecoregion
The Scott Mountains are within the Klamath-Siskiyou forests — Klamath Mountains ecoregion, which is part of the Temperate coniferous forests Biome.

Flora
The wildflower Scott Mountain phacelia (Phacelia dalesiana) is endemic to a small area of Scott Mountain.

Plant communities in the range include:
California mixed evergreen forest
Cedar hemlock douglas-fir forest

References

See also

Klamath Mountains System
List of mountain ranges of California

Klamath Mountains
Mountain ranges of Siskiyou County, California
Mountain ranges of Trinity County, California
Klamath National Forest
Shasta-Trinity National Forest
Mountain ranges of Northern California